The canton of Les Martres-de-Veyre is an administrative division of the Puy-de-Dôme department, central France. It was created at the French canton reorganisation which came into effect in March 2015. Its seat is in Les Martres-de-Veyre.

It consists of the following communes:
 
Authezat
Chanonat
Corent
Le Crest
Les Martres-de-Veyre
Orcet
La Roche-Blanche
Saint-Amant-Tallende
La Sauvetat
Tallende
Veyre-Monton

References

Cantons of Puy-de-Dôme